Kilan (or more properly, Kailan, also Romanized as Kīlān; also known as Kilun) is a city in the Central District of Damavand County, Tehran province, Iran. At the 2006 census, its population was 3,038 in 913 households. The following census in 2011 counted 2,981 people in 902 households. The latest census in 2016 showed a population of 2,882 people in 927 households.

The name is derived from the Tati tribe of Kailan/Khailan/Gailan who were settled in this region in tati period. Only  still speak Tati language (Iran). The local folklore, however, produces a folk etymology for the now mysterious name as "meaning  ' Kingsplace.

The earliest human settlement near Kilan is the Neolithic site of Qaleh Asgar located about 1.2 km southeast of Kilan. The site was excavated by Enayatolah Amirlou, who assigned it to the Epipaleolithic period. A reexamination of archaeological finds by Fereidoun Biglari showed that the site is Neolithic and dates back to about 8000 years ago.

As of 2006, there are around 3,000 inhabitants, with a remarkably high (75%) of the inhabitants of the city having academic degrees.

References

External links

Kilan at blogfa.com

Damavand County

Cities in Tehran Province

Populated places in Tehran Province

Populated places in Damavand County